Hans Arnold Engelhard (16 September  1934 – 11 March  2008) was a German jurist. A member of the Free Democratic Party (FDP), he served as German Federal Minister of Justice in the Cabinet Kohl I, II, and III, between 1982 and 1991.

Born in Munich, Engelhard studied law at the University of Erlangen and the Ludwig Maximilian University of Munich, and received his second Staatsexamen in 1963.

Having joined the Free Democratic Party in 1954, he won a seat in the Bundestag in the 1972 German federal election.

In 1982, he succeeded Jürgen Schmude as Federal Minister of Justice of Germany, and served until 1992.

Auszeichnungen 
 1984: Bayerischer Verdienstorden
 1989: Bundesverdienstkreuz

Further reading

1934 births
2008 deaths
Jurists from Bavaria
Ludwig Maximilian University of Munich alumni
Justice ministers of Germany
Members of the Bundestag for Bavaria
Members of the Bundestag 1990–1994
Members of the Bundestag 1987–1990
Members of the Bundestag 1983–1987
Members of the Bundestag 1980–1983
Members of the Bundestag 1976–1980
Members of the Bundestag 1972–1976
Knights Commander of the Order of Merit of the Federal Republic of Germany
Members of the Bundestag for the Free Democratic Party (Germany)